Carla Mercurio (Pescara, 26 October 1960) is an Italian former sprinter.

Biography
Carla Mercurio has 25 caps in national team from 1980 to 1986.

Achievements

National championships
In the Marisa Masullo era, Carla Mercurio has won just one time the individual national championship.
1 win on 200 metres (1984)

See also
 Italy national relay team

References

External links
 

1960 births
Italian female sprinters
Universiade medalists in athletics (track and field)
Living people
World Athletics Championships athletes for Italy
Universiade bronze medalists for Italy
Medalists at the 1981 Summer Universiade